Mary Bryant (1765–after 1794) was a Cornish convict who escaped from an Australian penal colony.

Mary Bryant may also refer to:
Mary E. Bryant, namesake of an elementary school in the Hillsborough County Public Schools

See also
The Incredible Journey of Mary Bryant, 2005 Australian miniseries about the Australian convict
Mary Bryan (disambiguation)